Gabriel Mvumvure (born 23 February 1988) is a Zimbabwean sprinter. He represented his country at three outdoor and two indoor World Championships.

Personal bests
Outdoor
100 metres – 9.98 (+1.9 m/s, Montverde 2013)
200 metres – 20.67 (+1.8 m/s, Coral Gables 2011)
Indoor
60 metres – 6.60 (Sopot 2014)
200 metres – 20.96 (Fayetteville 2011)

Competition record

References

1988 births
Living people
Alumni of Churchill School (Harare)
Zimbabwean male sprinters
Sportspeople from Harare
LSU Tigers track and field athletes
World Athletics Championships athletes for Zimbabwe
Athletes (track and field) at the 2016 Summer Olympics
Olympic athletes of Zimbabwe
African Games bronze medalists for Zimbabwe
African Games medalists in athletics (track and field)
Athletes (track and field) at the 2007 All-Africa Games